Peer Ali Khan (born: 1812; death: July 7, 1857) was an Indian revolutionary and rebel, who participated in the Indian independence movement. He was given capital punishment for participating in the freedom struggle of 1857.

Khan was a bookbinder by profession and he used to secretly distribute important leaflets, pamphlets and coded messages to freedom fighters. He conducted regular campaigns against the British government.

He was arrested along with his 33 followers on July 4, 1857.

On July 7, 1857, Khan was hanged in full public view by William Tayler, the then commissioner of Patna, along with 14 other rebellions, include Ghasita Khalifa, Ghulam Abbas, Nandu Lal alias Sipahi, Jumman, Maduwa, Kajil Khan, Ramzani, Peer Bakhsh, Peer Ali, Wahid Ali, Ghulam Ali, Mahmood Akbar and Asrar Ali Khan.

Commemoration 
A road adjacent to the Patna Airport is named after him by Nitish Kumar's government in 2008. Also, Saheed Peer Ali Khan Park, a children's park in front of the District Magistrate's residence near the Gandhi Maidan in Patna, was named after him by the State Government of Bihar.

Further reading

References 

Revolutionaries of the Indian Rebellion of 1857
Executed Indian people
Executed revolutionaries
People executed by British India by hanging
1812 births
1857 deaths
People from Bihar
People from Uttar Pradesh
Indian revolutionaries
Indian independence activists from Bihar
People from Azamgarh district